Flook is an Anglo-Irish band playing traditional-style instrumental music, much of it penned by the band themselves. Their music is typified by extremely fast, sometimes percussive, flute and whistle atop complex guitar and bodhrán rhythms. Flook is made up of Brian Finnegan, Sarah Allen, Ed Boyd and John Joe Kelly.

History
The band was formed in 1995, originally by Becky Morris, with three flute-playing friends Sarah Allen, Brian Finnegan and Michael McGoldrick, (who left in 1997 to join Capercaillie). The band was briefly known as Three Nations Flutes.

Flook's 10th anniversary tour included a concert at the Purcell Room (on 7 November 2005) as part of a week of "Folk in the Fall" on London's South Bank and another at the new Sage Gateshead concert hall on the south bank of the River Tyne on 10 November 2005. Their third studio album, Haven, was released in October 2005.

In December 2008 the band sent a Christmas message saying they were disbanding. "We wanted to wish you a very Happy Christmas and also to share some news with you," said a band press release. "After 13-plus years, hundreds of gigs, millions of miles traveled together and countless brilliant times, we've decided to call it a day. It might be forever or a prolonged pause, who knows, but we're all still great friends and will always remain so. This might sound like a cliché but it is deeply truthful."

The group reformed briefly for an appearance on the BBC Northern Ireland programme, Blas Ceoil and came back together again in 2013. They restarted to perform live regularly, touring the world with rapturous feedbacks: they brought their distinguishable sound in great venues such as the Kings Place in London, the "Soma Festival" in Belfast, the Bolshoi Theatre in Moscow and the "Star Pine's cafe" in Tokyo.

On Friday 12 January 2018, the group posted a photo of themselves, with the caption "It’s a new year and we’re in Bath (United Kingdom) rehearsing new tunes", reported by Lynette Fay on BBC Radio Ulster's Folk Club on 14 January 2018, who described the band as "iconic, ground-breaking, progressive and all-round brilliant".

Flook's most recent album, "Ancora", was released on April 12 2019. Folk Radio UK praised the album, writing "expectations more than fully met – simply a brilliant album". Bright Young Folk wrote that "«Ancora» is the highest peak of their more than twenty year old career."

Band members
Sarah Allen plays flute, alto flute and accordion. She has also been a member of the Barely Works, Bigjig, The Happy End Big Band and The Waterboys.
Brian Finnegan plays wooden flutes, low whistle and tin whistle. He has been a member of Upstairs in a Tent (originally Gan Ainm), Maalstroom, Aquarium and KAN.
Ed Boyd plays guitars and bouzouki. He became a permanent member of Lunasa in 2012. He is a former member of Red Ciel.
John Joe Kelly plays bodhrán and mandolin. He has also worked with Altan and Paul Brady and is a session musician.
 Damien O'Kane joined the band temporarily in 2008, playing banjo and tenor guitar as well as singing.
 Michael McGoldrick, plays wooden flute, low whistle, uilleann pipes and tin whistle, left Flook in 1997 to join Capercaillie.

Discography

Albums
Flook! Live! (1996) Small CD 9405
Flatfish (1999) Flatfish Records 002CD
Rubai (2002) Flatfish Records 004CD
Haven (2005) Flatfish Records 005CD
Ancora (2019) Flatfish Records 006CD

Contributing artist
The Rough Guide to Irish Music (1996)

Performances (selection)
Celtic Connections, Glasgow
 Bath Folk Festival, Bath
 Wickham Festival, Wickham 
Irish Folk & Celtic Music, Balve
Kings Place, London
Bolshoi Theatre, Moscow
Soma Festival, Belfast
Sidmouth Folk Festival, Sidmouth
 Star Pine's Cafe, Tokyo
Cambridge Folk Festival, Cambridge
Irish night, Pagazzano

References

External links
Flook
Michael McGoldrick
Interview with Brian Finnegan, 1999
Interview by FolkRadio.co.uk, Sept 2006
Interview with Sarah Allen, 2021

Celtic music groups
British world music groups
Musical groups established in 1995